Bruno Duarte Ferreira Silva (born 17 May 1988) is a Portuguese cyclist, who currently rides for UCI Continental team .

Major results

2006
 8th Overall Vuelta al Besaya
2008
 1st Overall Volta à Madeira
1st Stage 3
 2nd Road race, National Under-23 Road Championships
2009
 1st Overall Volta à Madeira
1st Prologue (TTT) & Stages 1, 2 & 4
 3rd Overall Volta a Portugal do Futuro
 5th Overall Vuelta Ciclista a León
 9th Overall Grand Prix du Portugal
2010
 1st Stage 3 Volta a Portugal do Futuro
 2nd Overall Volta à Madeira
1st Stage 2
 5th Overall Troféu Joaquim Agostinho
 6th Overall Vuelta Ciclista a León
2011
 3rd Overall Vuelta a Tenerife
2013
 1st Challenge Cidade de Loulé
 4th Road race, National Road Championships
 5th Overall Troféu Joaquim Agostinho
1st  Mountains classification
2015
 1st  Mountains classification Volta a Portugal
 9th Overall Troféu Joaquim Agostinho
2016
 1st Circuito de Nafarros
 5th Overall Troféu Joaquim Agostinho
2019
 1st  Mountains classification Vuelta a Castilla y León
 1st Circuito de Nafarros
2021
 1st  Mountains classification Volta a Portugal

References

External links

1988 births
Living people
Portuguese male cyclists
People from Valongo
Sportspeople from Porto District